Luis Alberto Monge Alauy (born 27 January 1992) is an Argentine professional footballer who plays as a defender for Talleres Remedios

Career
Monge played at youth level for Tiro Suizo and River Plate. Monge departed in June 2013, signing for Primera B Metropolitana's Defensores de Belgrano. He featured thirty-eight times in the 2013–14 campaign, as he also received the first red card on his senior career on 10 November against Deportivo Armenio. On 30 June 2014, Monge joined Barracas Central. He made his bow in a home draw with UAI Urquiza on 8 August, on the way to fifty matches across two seasons. Fénix became Monge's third club in January 2016. Eighteen appearances came, as did his first goal in 2016's penultimate game versus Deportivo Riestra.

Having spent the 2016–17 campaign on loan with Atlanta, Monge switched Fénix for Acassuso on 27 July 2017. He played every minute of the club's thirty-four fixtures in his debut season as they reached the promotion play-offs; where they would get eliminated by UAI Urquiza in round one.

Career statistics
.

References

External links

1992 births
Living people
People from Santiago del Estero
Argentine footballers
Association football defenders
Primera B Metropolitana players
Defensores de Belgrano footballers
Barracas Central players
Club Atlético Fénix players
Club Atlético Atlanta footballers
Club Atlético Acassuso footballers
Club Atlético Los Andes footballers
Talleres de Remedios de Escalada footballers
Sportspeople from Santiago del Estero Province